New Hampton High School is located in New Hampton, Iowa and is part of the New Hampton Community School District. The school's mascot is the Chickasaw.

The school is located on Main Street on the west edge of New Hampton.

Athletics
New Hampton is a founding member of the Northeast Iowa Conference, and the Chickasaws participate in the following sports:
Cross Country
 Girls' 2-time State Champions (1981, 1982)
Volleyball
Football
 1999 Class 3A State Champions<
Basketball
 Boys' 1993 Class 3A State Champions
Swimming
Wrestling
 6-time State Champions (1933, 1957, 1959, 1963, 1990, 1993) 
 3-time Class 2A State Duals Champions (1990, 1993, 2005) 
Track and Field 
 Girls' 1996 Class 2A State Champions
Golf
Baseball
Softball

Notable alumni
Eve Drewelowe painter
Mike Humpal, National Football League player
Duane Josephson, Major League Baseball player
Sarah Utterback, actress
Coleen Rowley, United States Attorney

See also
List of high schools in Iowa

References

External links
New Hampton High School website
New Hampton Community School District website

Public high schools in Iowa
Schools in Chickasaw County, Iowa